KK Crvena zvezda is a men's professional basketball club based in Belgrade, Serbia. Crvena zvezda is a part of the Adriatic Basketball Association and competes domestically in the ABA League and the Serbian League. The Zvezda is regarded as one of the most successful clubs in Serbia history; their squads have won 21 National League championships, including in 10-in-a-row and current 6-in-a-row sequences. They have played in three different National Leagues since 1945, including the Yugoslav First Federal League (1945–1992), the First League of Serbia and Montenegro (1992–2006) and the Serbian League (2006 onward). They have also won ten National Cup titles, five Adriatic League Championships, one Adriatic Supercup, and one FIBA Saporta Cup (1974). The team play domestic home matches in the Aleksandar Nikolić Hall, and the EuroLeague or EuroCup home matches in Štark Arena.

Crvena zvezda is the only club in the world to have produced two members now in the Hall of Fame (Borislav Stanković and Aleksandar Nikolić) and four in the FIBA Hall of Fame (Stanković, Nebojša Popović, Radomir Šaper, and Nikolić). The four of them have the highest Order of Merit from FIBA. The Zvezda has selected eight former players as the Zvezdine zvezde (meaning The Stars of Red Star), including Aleksandar Gec, Popović, Nikolić, Stanković, Vladimir Cvetković, Zoran Slavnić, Zoran Radović, and Saša Obradović.

Five father-and-son combinations were played for Crvena zvezda, including the Cvetkovićs (Vladimir and Rastko), the Topićs (Milenko and Nikola), the Koprivicas (Žarko and Jovan), the Pavlovićs (Tihomir and Mirko), and the Rakočevićs (Goran and Igor). Two brothers duos played for the club, including the Dragićević twins (Tadija and Strahinja) and the Trifunovićs (Aleksandar and Časlav). 

Popović, Gec, Milan Bjegojević, Đorđe Andrijašević, Nikolić, Nemanja Đurić, Strahinja Alagić, Dragiša Vučinić, Slavnić, Vladislav Lučić, Stevan Karadžić, Aleksandar Trifunović, Milenko Topić, and Obradović were the Zvezda's head coaches. Popović and Vučinić were player-coaches, also.

There are two players with the same first and last name, Nikola Jovanović, who played for Crvena zvezda. The older Nikola played for the club in the early 1990s, while the younger Nikola played in the late 2010s.

Greek center Sofoklis Schortsanitis, signed in August 2015, became the 400th registered player in club's history.

The list is composed of players who played at least one official game for Crvena zvezda.



Key 

Note: Statistics are correct through the start of the 2022–23 season.

A to B

C to D

E to J

K to L

M

N to Q

R

S

T to Z

See also 
 List of KK Crvena zvezda players with 100 games played
 KK Partizan all-time roster

Notes
Former nationalities

Other nationalities

Other notes

References

Red Star Belgrade
Lists of basketball players in Serbia